The R805 road is a regional road in Dublin, Ireland.

The official definition of the R805 from the Roads Act 1993 (Classification of Regional Roads) Order 2012 states:
R805: Ellis Quay - Finglas, Dublin

Between its junction with R148 at Ellis Quay and its junction with R102 at River Road via Blackhall Place (and via Hendrick Street), Stoneybatter, Manor Street, Prussia Street, Old Cabra Road and Ratoath Road all in the city of Dublin.

In February 2015, a realignment of the road at Cabra was opened, which crosses the Royal Canal and the Dublin–Sligo railway line via a new bridge, instead of the previous narrow humpbacked and zig-zagged Reilly's Bridge and level crossing, respectively.

See also
Roads in Ireland
Regional road

References

Regional roads in the Republic of Ireland
Roads in County Dublin